Frank Stephenson Dillane (born 21 April 1991) is an English actor and musician. He is known for his roles as Nick Clark on Fear the Walking Dead (2015–2018) and 16-year-old Tom Riddle in the film Harry Potter and the Half-Blood Prince (2009). He also appeared as Henry Coffin in the film In the Heart of the Sea (2015). Dillane plays a recurring role in the 2022 gothic romance miniseries The Essex Serpent.

Early life and family
Dillane was born in London, England. His father is actor Stephen Dillane. His mother, Naomi Wirthner, is British and Afro-Jamaican; she manages a theatre company called The Barebones Project. He spent part of his childhood in Brixton, before moving to Forest Row in East Sussex.

After passing his A-level examinations, Dillane was accepted to the Royal Academy of Dramatic Art (RADA) and graduated in 2013, with a Bachelor of Arts in Acting.

Acting career
Dillane has acted in film, on stage, and on television. He made his film debut at his father's side as an extra in Welcome to Sarajevo (1997) when he was six years of age. He became more widely known when he portrayed Tom Riddle (a teenage Lord Voldemort) in Harry Potter and the Half-Blood Prince (2009).

Dillane played James Papadopoulos in the independent movie Papadopoulos & Sons (directed by Marcus Markou) in 2011. After Dillane was cast, his father decided to rearrange his own filming schedule to play Harry Papadopoulos (James' dad). Stephen Dillane declared it was rare to have the opportunity "to work with your children after they left home".

In July 2013, Dillane played in Candida at Theatre Royal, Bath, directed by Simon Godwin. In 2014, he played the role of Keyes in Viena and the Fantomes, directed by Gerardo Naranjo; Dakota Fanning also starred in the film. Also in 2014, he was cast in a proposed adaptation of Peter Goldsworthy's best-selling novel Maestro, which was to be directed by Catherine Jarvis.

Dillane starred as Nick Clark, a "shaggy-haired recovering addict", in the horror drama series Fear the Walking Dead from its debut in 2015 until its fourth season. The role was a breakout role for Dillane, who was a fan favorite on the show. In 2016, he was nominated for a Saturn Award for Best Younger Actor in a Television Series for his work on Fear the Walking Dead.

He played Owen Coffin in In the Heart of the Sea (2015). This adventure-drama film directed by Ron Howard is based on Nathaniel Philbrick's non-fiction book of the same name about the sinking of the American whaling ship Essex in 1820, an event that inspired the novel Moby-Dick.

Dillane portrayed Shugs in the Netflix series Sense8, directed by the Wachowskis.

He appeared alongside Beanie Feldstein and Alfie Allen in How to Build a Girl (2019), directed by Coky Giedroyc.

Filmography

Film

Television

Awards and nominations

References

External links
 

1991 births
English male film actors
Living people
Male actors from London
21st-century English male actors
Male actors from Sussex
People from Brixton
Alumni of RADA
People from Forest Row
20th-century English male actors
English male child actors
English male television actors
English people of Australian descent
English people of Jamaican descent